Châtres-sur-Cher (literally Châtres on Cher) is a commune in the Loir-et-Cher department, central France.

Geography
The Rère forms the commune's northern border. The Cher forms part of the commune's southern border.

Population

See also
Communes of the Loir-et-Cher department

References

Communes of Loir-et-Cher